Hentzia grenada is a species of jumping spider. It is found in Florida and south Georgia in the United States.

References

Further reading

External links

 

Salticidae
Articles created by Qbugbot
Spiders described in 1894